The Tiger Rising is a 2001 children's book written by Newbery Medal winning author Kate DiCamillo. It is about a 12-year-old named Rob Horton who finds a caged tiger in the center of the woods near his home. The book was a National Book Award Finalist.

Plot
Rob Horton is 12 years old and lives with his father in a Florida motel called the Kentucky Star. His father (named Robert), and Rob have recently moved to Lister, Florida, after the death of Rob's mother, Caroline. Rob is quiet and often is bullied at school. Things begin to change when  Rob discovers a tiger in the forest (locked up in a cage) while wandering the woods. He then meets a girl named Sistine Bailey (named after the Sistine Chapel) who has recently moved nearby. Rob shows Sistine the tiger. Rob, who usually keeps his feelings locked away begins to involuntarily open up emotionally to Sistine. Though Sistine insists on letting the tiger go, Rob is wary of what will happen to it if he does. Rob finally relents and releases the tiger, letting it run into the woods. However, just moments later, Rob's father shoots the tiger dead. Rob’s father is then seen holding the gun over the tiger in front of the Kentucky Star. Rob then angrily attacks his father and tells him he wishes his father died instead of his mother, and also forces him to say the name Caroline Horton, which Rob is forbidden to say. Rob also insists they bury the tiger, and have a funeral. At the tiger's funeral, Sistine recites a part of William Blake's The Tyger. Rob and his father confront their unresolved feelings about Rob's mother and Rob begins looking forward to going to school with Sistine.

Characters
Rob Horton – Rob and his father (Robert Horton) moved from Jacksonville to Lister after his mother's (Caroline Horton) death. He stays at the Kentucky Star Hotel along with his father who works there. He is a silent kid and usually gets bullied. He also discovers the tiger in the cage. Rob is the male protagonist in the story.

Sistine Bailey – Sistine (or Sissy) and her mother move to Lister.  Sistine is Rob's classmate. Sistine's parents are divorced after her father had an affair with his secretary. As compared to Rob, she is very open emotionally and gets judged by other people at school.

Willie May – Housekeeper of the Kentucky Star. Though uneducated, she gives sage advice to Rob and Sistine, leading Sistine to claim she is a prophetess. She and Rob both have a connection to losing a loved one.

Robert Horton – Rob's dad. He works at the Kentucky Star Motel and is underpaid by Beauchamp.

Caroline Horton – Rob's mom. She  died of lung cancer before Rob and his dad moved to Lister, Florida.

Beauchamp – Owner of the Kentucky Star motel, the woods behind the motel, and the tiger.

The Tiger – The tiger is described as a beautiful and poor animal trapped cruelly in a cage where he cannot escape. He paces around in the cage and is fed by Beauchamp and then Rob. After Rob and Sistine let the tiger out of its cage, it was shot by Rob's dad and died.

Cricket – Willie May’s childhood pet parakeet that she lets go and eventually is thought to be killed by a snake.

Norton and Billy Threemonger – Two "redneck" brothers who bully Rob in school and on the bus.

Mrs. Bailey – Sistine's mom. She babies Sistine and forces her to wear dresses. Her husband cheated on her with his secretary 

Mr. Phelmer – Principal of Rob's school who views Rob as a nuisance, neglects him, and feels uncomfortable talking to him. He later tells Rob that he cannot come to school in case a disease in his legs is contagious.

References

2001 American novels
2001 children's books
American children's novels
American novels adapted into films
Books about tigers
Candlewick Press books
Novels set in Florida